Elias Ribeiro de Oliveira, known as Elias (born in Santa Rita do Sapucaí, September 2, 1983), is a Brazilian footballer who plays as an attacking midfielder for Iporá.

Career

Bahia
Began in the youth ranks of São Paulo, but was excused. "They São Paulo have a good base with great players, and at that time there was a waiver, they sent ten players though, and I was in the middle. But at seventeen, learned a lot and have evolved a lot over there," say, in 2010, told the newspaper Lance!. In 2003, he made his first professional game as the tricolor in Bahia Campeonato Brasileiro Serie A. He gradually been increasing and in 2006, the octagonal Series C, 2006, in Ba Vi, scored the first goal of the match and took the second goal. The game ended in victory for the Bahia 2-1.

Vasco
In early 2007, thanks to his performance by the tricolor, was loaned to Vasco da Gama, Romario to help make his thousandth goal. Getting there suffered from conjunctivitis and bruises, and had his loan contract renewed after four months.

Return to Bahia
On his return he scored a goal on his debut soon, and six more in the next fifteen games. In Bahia State Championship 2008 was the team's leading scorer tricolor, with twelve goals. In his hundredth game for the tricolor scored a goal in the defeat of Bahia for Marilia by 3 to 1. In Series B of 2008 was the playmaker of the moves and the "brain" of the team.

Fluminense
It was sold to Fluminense in September 2008 to replace former idol and tricolor das Laranjeiras Thiago Neves, who had been sold to Hamburg, Germany. No room at the club, was on loan at Atletico Goianiense in 2009. "There were two chances I had to go through big clubs," sorry in 2010, referring to Vasco and Fluminense, "but had no chance to show my work".

Atlético Goianiense
In 2009, he was on loan to Atlético-GO, and after a period in reserve, has become the main player on the team in the Brazilian Championship in 2010. Has disputed the artillery of the Brazilian Championship in 2010. " It is a particular goal, "he said in an interview to Lance! in September 2010. "Scoring goals and therefore fight for the artillery of the tournament only help the athletic as well." [1] Atletico coach, Rene Simoes, spared no praise for Elias Ribeiro interview in the same newspaper: "In my view, is half of frame extinction in Brazilian football. That Canhotinho that, apart from arriving at the peril ahead, give assistance to attackers.

Atlas de Guadalajara
Club Atlas de Guadalajara in Mexico, confirmed on 13 December 2010 the acquisition of Elias.

Al Ain
On 8 January 2011, he signed a six-month deal with UAE side Al Ain.

Figueirense
On 21 June 2011, he agreed to play for Figueirense before the contract with Al Ain expired. He signed a contract lasting until 31 December 2013.

Khazar Lankaran
On 31 January 2014, Elias Ribeiro joined Khazar Lankaran on an 18-month contract. Elias was released by Khazar at the end of June 2014, only six-months into his contract.

Honours 
Atlético Goianiense
Campeonato Goiano: 2010

Fortaleza
 Campeonato Cearense: 2016

References

External links
ogol
Elias at Footballzz

1983 births
Brazilian footballers
Brazilian expatriate footballers
Living people

São Paulo FC players
CR Vasco da Gama players
Esporte Clube Bahia players
Fluminense FC players
Atlético Clube Goianiense players
Figueirense FC players
Al Ain FC players
Club Athletico Paranaense players
Associação Atlética Ponte Preta players
Khazar Lankaran FK players
Esporte Clube XV de Novembro (Piracicaba) players
Fortaleza Esporte Clube players
América Futebol Clube (RN) players
Associação Atlética Aparecidense players
Associação Atlética Anapolina players
Iporá Esporte Clube players
Vila Nova Futebol Clube players
Goianésia Esporte Clube players
Campeonato Brasileiro Série A players
Campeonato Brasileiro Série B players
Campeonato Brasileiro Série C players
Azerbaijan Premier League players
UAE Pro League players
Association football midfielders
Brazilian expatriate sportspeople in the United Arab Emirates
Brazilian expatriate sportspeople in Azerbaijan
Expatriate footballers in the United Arab Emirates
Expatriate footballers in Azerbaijan